Laodice (meaning "people-justice") may refer to:

Greek mythology
see Laodice (Greek myth)
Laodice (daughter of Priam), a princess of Troy
 Laodice, daughter of Agamemnon, sometimes conflated with Electra
 Laodice, one of the Hyperborean maidens
 Laodice, consort of Phoroneus
 Laodice, daughter of Cinyras and Metharme, wife of Elatus, mother of Stymphalus and Pereus
 Laodice, daughter of Agapenor
 Laodice, daughter of Aloeus, wife of Aeolus and mother of Salmoneus and Cretheus
 Laodice, alternate name for Iphthime
 Laodice, daughter of Iphis, mother of Capaneus
 Laodice, a lover of Poseidon

Egypt
 Ladice of Cyrene (fl. 548 BC to 526 BC), a Cyrenaean princess, member of the Battiad dynasty, and consort of the ancient Egyptian pharaoh Amasis II (erroneously named Laodice by Montaigne in his essays)

Noblewoman from the Seleucid Empire
 Laodice of Macedonia, wife of General Antiochus (fl. 4th century BC), mother of Seleucus I Nicator
 Laodice I (3rd century BC), queen of Antiochus II Theos and mother of Seleucus II Callinicus
 Laodice II (3rd century BC), queen of Seleucus II Callinicus
 Laodice III (fl. 222 BC), daughter of Mithridates II of Pontus and Laodice, first wife of Antiochus III the Great
 Laodice IV (fl. 3rd century BC & 2nd century BC), daughter of Antiochus III the Great and Laodice III, wife of Antiochus, Seleucus IV Philopator and Antiochus IV Epiphanes
 Laodice V (fl. 2nd century BC), daughter of Seleucus IV Philopator and Laodice IV, wife of Perseus of Macedon and later a possible wife of Demetrius I Soter
 Laodice (ca. 358–281 BC), daughter of Seleucus I Nicator and Apama
 Laodice (d. 261 BC), daughter of Antiochus I Soter and Stratonice of Syria
 Laodice (fl. 2nd century BC), daughter of Cleopatra Thea and Demetrius II Nicator, who married Phraates II of Parthia
 Laodice (fl. 2nd century BC), presumed daughter of Antiochus VII Sidetes and Cleopatra Thea
 Laodice of the Sameans (fl. 1st century BC), a queen of a tribe who asked king Antiochus X Eusebes for help against the Parthians

Relations of Eucratides I
 Laodice, mother of Eucratides I (reigned 170–145 BC) of Bactria, wife of Heliocles
 Laodice, another woman who was wife of Eucratides I

Relations of Mithridates II to Mithridates VI of Pontus
 Laodice (wife of Mithridates II of Pontus) (fl. 3rd century BC), daughter of Antiochus II Theos and Laodice I, wife of Mithridates II of Pontus
 Laodice of Pontus (fl. 213 BC), sister to Laodice III, another daughter of Mithridates II of Pontus and Laodice, wife of Seleucid general Achaeus
 Laodice (wife of Mithridates III of Pontus) (fl. 3rd century BC & flourished 2nd century BC), wife of Mithridates III of Pontus
 Laodice (sister-wife of Mithridates IV of Pontus) (fl. 2nd century BC), daughter to Mithridates III of Pontus and Laodice, sister-wife of Mithridates IV of Pontus
 Nysa of Cappadocia also known as Laodice (fl. 2nd century BC), daughter of Pharances I of Pontus and Nysa, wife of Ariarathes V of Cappadocia, mother of Ariarathes VI of Cappadocia
 Laodice VI (fl. 2nd century BC), daughter of Antiochus IV Epiphanes and Laodice IV, wife of Mithridates V of Pontus
 Laodice of Cappadocia (fl. 2nd century BC & 1st century BC), daughter of Mithridates V of Pontus and Laodice VI, wife of Ariarathes VI of Cappadocia
 Laodice (sister-wife of Mithridates VI of Pontus) (fl. 2nd century BC & 1st century BC), daughter of Mithridates V of Pontus and Laodice VI, sister-wife and first wife of Mithridates VI of Pontus

Relations of Antiochus I Theos of Commagene
 Laodice VII Thea (born after 122 BC), daughter of Antiochus VIII Grypus, and wife of Mithridates I Callinicus and mother of Antiochus I Theos of Commagene
 Laodice of Parthia (1st century BC), daughter of Antiochus I Theos of Commagene, and wife of Orodes II of Parthia

See also 
 Laodicea (disambiguation)
 Laoticus (disambiguation)
 Laodicus (disambiguation)